18 Aquilae (abbreviated 18 Aql) is a triple star system in the constellation of Aquila. 18 Aquilae is the Flamsteed designation; it also bears the variable star designation Y Aquilae. It has an apparent visual magnitude of 5.07.

The inner pair of stars in this system form a spectroscopic binary with a combined magnitude of 5.44 and an orbital period of 1.302 days. The primary component is a giant star with a stellar classification of B8 III. Because the orbital plane is inclined near the line of sight, two form an eclipsing binary system. The eclipse of the primary component causes a 0.04 drop in magnitude, while the eclipse of the secondary results in a decrease of 0.03. At an angular separation of 0.310 arcseconds is the magnitude 6.39 tertiary component. This system has a high peculiar velocity of  relative to the neighboring stars.

References

External links
 Image 18 Aquilae
 HR 7248

Aquila (constellation)
Eclipsing binaries
Spectroscopic binaries
Triple star systems
18 Aquilae A
Aquilae, 18
Aquilae, Y
178125
7248
093867
BD+10 3787